California's 27th congressional district is a congressional district in the U.S. state of California. It was one of 18 districts that voted for Joe Biden in the 2020 presidential election while being won or held by a Republican in 2022.

The district includes most of northern Los Angeles County, including the cities of Santa Clarita, Palmdale, and Lancaster, and parts of the northwestern San Fernando Valley in the city of Los Angeles. Prior to redistricting in 2022, the district was located in the San Gabriel Valley.

Competitiveness

In statewide races

Composition

As of the 2020 redistricting, California's 27th congressional district is located in southern California. It encompasses most of northern Los Angeles County, including the cities of Santa Clarita, Lancaster, and Palmdale, California; the neighborhoods of Porter Ranch and Granada Hills in the city of Los Angeles, along with the Sierra Pelona Mountains and the northern slopes of the San Gabriel Mountains.

Cities & CDP with 10,000 or more people
 Santa Clarita - 228,673
 Lancaster - 173,516
 Palmdale - 169,450

List of members representing the district

Election results

1952

1954

1956

1958

1960

1962

1964

1966

1968

1969 (Special)

1970

1972

1974

1976

1978

1980

1982

1984

1986

1988

1990

1992

1994

1996

1998

2000

2002

2004

2006

2008

2010

2012

2014

2016

2018

2020

See also

 List of United States congressional districts

References

External links
 GovTrack.us: California's 27th congressional district
 RAND California Election Returns: District Definitions
 California Voter Foundation map - CD27

27
Government of Los Angeles County, California
Alhambra, California
Altadena, California
Arcadia, California
Claremont, California
Glendora, California
Monrovia, California
Pasadena, California
San Gabriel, California
San Marino, California
Sierra Madre, California
South Pasadena, California
Temple City, California
Upland, California
Constituencies established in 1953
1953 establishments in California